Epipyrops exigua or Fulgoraecia exigua, the planthopper parasite moth, is a moth in the Epipyropidae family. It was described by Henry Edwards in 1882. It is found in North America, where it has been recorded from New Jersey and Pennsylvania to central Florida, west to Missouri, Texas, New Mexico, Arizona and California.

The wingspan is 8–13 mm. Adults are on wing from June to October.

The larvae feed on planthoppers of the superfamily Fulgoroidea. The first-instar larva is an ectoparasite of the planthopper, sucking body fluids from the abdomen beneath the wings.

References

 BAMONA. Planthopper Parasite Moth. Fulgoraecia exigua (Henry Edwards, 1882)

Moths described in 1882
Epipyropidae